Clodoaldo Tavares de Santana, better known as Clodoaldo (born 25 September 1949 in Aracaju), is a Brazilian former footballer who played as a midfielder.

Career
Clodoaldo usually played as a defensive midfielder for both Santos Futebol Clube and the Brazil national team, for whom he was capped 38 times (scoring one goal) between 1969 and 1974.

He was part of the Brazil squad that won the 1970 FIFA World Cup, and scored the equalising goal in the semi-final against Uruguay. He then memorably contributed to the famous goal by Carlos Alberto Torres against Italy in the final by dribbling past four of the opposition's players in his own half.

He played his club football for Santos (1966–79), Tampa Bay Rowdies (1980), and Nacional-AM (1981).

Honours

Club
Santos FC
 Campeonato Paulista (São Paulo state championship):1967, 1968, 1969, 1973, 1978
 Campeonato Brasileiro Série A: 1968

International
Brazil
 FIFA World Cup: 1970
 Roca Cup: 1971

References

1949 births
Living people
Brazilian footballers
Brazilian expatriate footballers
1970 FIFA World Cup players
FIFA World Cup-winning players
Santos FC players
Nacional Futebol Clube players
Brazil international footballers
North American Soccer League (1968–1984) players
Tampa Bay Rowdies (1975–1993) players
Expatriate soccer players in the United States
Brazilian expatriate sportspeople in the United States
Brazilian football managers
Santos FC managers
Timor-Leste national football team managers
Association football midfielders